James Smith Maguire (born 3 February 1932) is a Scottish former footballer, who played for Dumbarton, Queen of the South, Rochdale, Alloa Athletic and Brechin City.

References

External links

1932 births
Scottish footballers
Dumbarton F.C. players
Queen of the South F.C. players
Rochdale A.F.C. players
Alloa Athletic F.C. players
Brechin City F.C. players
Scottish Football League players
Living people
Association football wingers
English Football League players
Ashfield F.C. players
Cambuslang Rangers F.C. players
Coleraine F.C. players